The Simply Orange Juice Company is an American fruit juice company based in Apopka, Florida that was founded in 2001 and is a brand of The Coca-Cola Company. It makes a several not-from-concentrate orange juices and other fruit juices that are sold refrigerated in a clear plastic bottle with a green twist top and large green seal.  The bottles have a wide body that starts tapering to a narrow neck at the top of the label.

The company, Simply Orange, is a major buyer of Florida oranges for its orange juice, but also imports orange juice from Brazil and Mexico. It uses computer-modeled system to blend the juice sources for a uniform taste throughout the year.

Company history 
The company was founded in 2001 by Minute Maid, launching three varieties of "Simply Orange" in the Northeastern United States: "Original", "Original with Calcium" and "Grove Made". The company expanded to the Southeastern United States and achieved national distribution by 2003. In 2004, they added a fourth variety,: "Country Stand with Calcium".

In 2006, the "Simply" line expanded with the launch of "Simply Lemonade" and "Simply Limeade". The Simply Orange Juice Company announced the addition of "Simply Grapefruit" in August 2007 and began shipping it to retailers in mid-September. "Simply Orange with Mango" and "Simply Orange with Pineapple" were added in mid-August 2008. In February 2009, "Simply Lemonade with Raspberry" became available. In January 2012, "Simply Cranberry Cocktail" and "Simply Lemonade with Mango" were released. The company introduced "Simply Peach" and "Simply Lemonade with Strawberry" in 2017. In 2018, the size of the 59oz bottles was reduced to 52oz due to rising costs. The company also launched the "Simply Light" brand with fewer calories and less sugar in the same year.

Reported by The Guardian in January 2023, the Simply Orange Juice Company was targeted by a class-action lawsuit, alleging that its “Tropical Juice” product is contaminated with toxic PFAS at levels that exceed federal advisory limits for drinking water by "hundreds of times".

Products 
A list of all of the Simply Orange Juice Company's known products.

 Simply Orange Pulp Free (100% juice)

Simply Orange Pulp Free with Calcium + Vitamin D
Simply Orange High Pulp
Simply Orange Medium Pulp with Calcium + Vitamin D
Simply Orange Low Acid
Simply Orange with Mango
Simply Orange with Pineapple
Simply Orange with Banana
Simply Orange with Tangerine
Simply Lemonade (11% lemon juice)
Simply Lemonade with Raspberry
Simply Lemonade with Mango
Simply Lemonade with Blueberry
Simply Limeade (12% lime juice)
Simply Grapefruit (100% juice)
Simply Apple (100% juice)
Simply Cranberry Cocktail (27% cranberry juice)
Simply Fruit Punch (pineapple, cherry, and cranberry, 15% juice)
Simply Tropical (pineapple, mango, lemon, 15% juice)
Simply Mixed Berry (cranberry, strawberry, blueberry and raspberry, 10% juice)
Simply Peach
Simply Lemonade with Strawberry
Simply Light Orange
Simply Light Lemonade
Simply Pineapple with Coconut
Simply Watermelon
Simply Smoothie Strawberry Banana
Simply Smoothie Mango Pineapple
Simply Smoothie Orchard Berry
Simply Almond Unsweetened
Simply Almond Original
Simply Almond Vanilla
Simply Oat Original
Simply Oat Creamy
Simply Oat Vanilla

Advertising
Since 2002, actor Donald Sutherland has been the voice-over spokesman for the Simply brand of juices and juice drinks, in a series of television commercials.

References

External links

The Coca-Cola Company

Juice brands
Food and drink companies established in 2001
Coca-Cola brands
Companies based in Orange County, Florida
Citrus industry in Florida